Karin van Essen-Moos (born Karin Moos; 3 March 1961) is a Dutch former professional tennis player.

Moos, who won a national doubles championship in 1979, competed on the professional tour through the 1980s and featured in five ties for the Netherlands Federation Cup team. In the 1984 Federation Cup she played a World Group fixture against France and had a singles win over Marie-Christine Calleja, but the Dutch ultimately lost the tie.

See also
List of Netherlands Fed Cup team representatives

References

External links
 
 
 

1961 births
Living people
Dutch female tennis players
20th-century Dutch women